The 1874 Invercargill mayoral election was held on 21 July 1874.

Thomas Pratt was elected mayor.

Results
The following table gives the election results:

References

1874 elections in New Zealand
Mayoral elections in Invercargill